Moyal may refer to:

People
Ann Moyal (1926–2019), Australian historian
Damien Moyal (born 1976), American vocalist, musician and designer
Diana López Moyal, Cuban flutist
Eliyahu Moyal (1920–1991), Israeli politician
Esther Moyal (1874–1948), Beirut-born Jewish journalist
Harel Moyal (born 1981), Israeli pop singer-songwriter and stage actor
José Enrique Moyal (1910–1998), mathematical physicist
Kobi Moyal (born 1987), Israeli footballer
Saul Moyal, Egyptian fencer
Shimon Moyal (1866–1915), Zionist activist and physician
Yohanan Moyal (born 1965), Israeli Olympic gymnast

Other
Moyal bracket, in physics, the suitably normalized antisymmetrization of the phase-space star product
Moyal product, in mathematics, perhaps the best-known example of a phase-space star product